Hugh Alan Anderson (September 25, 1933 – April 22, 2015) was a Canadian politician.

An insurance broker by trade, Anderson was elected to the House of Commons of Canada in the 1974 federal election representing the riding of Comox—Alberni, British Columbia. The Liberal MP served as Parliamentary Secretary to the Minister of Fisheries and the Environment from 1977 to 1978 and then as Parliamentary Secretary to the Minister of Indian Affairs and Northern Development until the 1979 federal election in which he was defeated.

Anderson has remained active in public life, serving since the 1990s as Chair of the Port Alberni Port Authority. He died on April 22, 2015.

References

External links
 

1933 births
2015 deaths
Liberal Party of Canada MPs
Members of the House of Commons of Canada from British Columbia
Politicians from Saskatoon